Tommy Talau (born 30 April 2000) is a professional rugby league footballer who plays as a  and er for the Wests Tigers in the National Rugby League (NRL).

Background
Talau was born in Sydney, New South Wales, Australia. He is the son of former New Zealand and Samoan international, Willie Talau.

Talau played his junior rugby league for the Moorebank Rams. He attended Westfields Sports High School and joined the junior ranks of the Canterbury-Bankstown Bulldogs. In 2018 he captained the Bulldogs' Under-18 team in the grand final of the S. G. Ball Cup. In the same year he was selected in the Australian Schoolboys rugby league team. At the end of the 2018 season he moved from the Bulldogs to the Wests Tigers, signing a development contract.

Career
He became the first player born in the 2000s to play for the Tigers.

In round 7 of the 2020 NRL season, Talau scored two tries as the Wests Tigers defeated Canterbury-Bankstown 34-6 at Bankwest Stadium.

Talau played 12 games and scored 8 tries for Wests Tigers in the 2020 NRL season as the club missed out on the finals by finishing 11th.

Talau played a total of 22 games for the Wests Tigers and scored 11 tries in the 2021 NRL season as the club finished 13th and missed the finals.

References

External links
Tigers profile

2000 births
Living people
Australian rugby league players
Australian sportspeople of Samoan descent
Australian people of New Zealand descent
Rugby league five-eighths
Rugby league centres
Rugby league players from Sydney
Wests Tigers players
Western Suburbs Magpies NSW Cup players